The Skeleton mixed team competition at the IBSF World Championships 2021 was held on 13 February 2021.

Results
The race was started at 09:04.

References

Skeleton mixed team